Xing'an District is an urban district of the city of Hegang, Heilongjiang province, China.

Administrative divisions 
Xing'an District is divided into 6 subdistricts and 1 town. 
6 subdistricts
 Xing'anlu, Xingjianlu, Xingzhanglu, Jundelu, Hedonglu, Guangyu
1 town
 Hongqi

Notes and references 

Xingan